The Royal Institution of Australia (RiAus) is a national scientific not-for-profit organisation with a mission to "bring science to people and people to science". It opened in October 2009.

Concept
The concept of a Royal Institution of Australia was proposed by Baroness Professor Susan Greenfield CBE, as Thinker in Residence for the South Australian Government during 2004 and 2005. Greenfield was Director of the Royal Institution of Great Britain from 1998 to 2010. The South Australian Premier Mike Rann was receptive of the idea and secured State, Federal and private sector funding for the building and the programs. The Royal Institution of Australia's inaugural Chairman is Peter Yates AM.

As a national hub for science communication, The Royal Institution of Australia promotes public awareness and understanding of science. The Institution highlights the importance of science in everyday life through Cosmos Magazine, the cosmosmagazine.com website, the SCINEMA International Science Film Festival, and the RiAus Education platform..

The Royal Institution of Australia foundation partners were the Government of South Australia, the Commonwealth Government and oil and gas company, Santos. It has a paid membership program, including both corporate and individual members.

The Royal Institution of Australia is the first and only sister organisation outside of the UK of the Royal Institution of Great Britain (RiGB).

Adelaide Stock Exchange Building

The Royal Institution of Australia is housed at The Science Exchange in Adelaide, South Australia, which is a former Stock Exchange building. Built in 1901 and designed by the architects Hedley Allen Dunn in collaboration with Henry Fuller, this red brick building in Federation/Edwardian style with Arts and Crafts influences (including a stained glass window by Morris & Co., with three of the six panels after the designs of Edward Burne-Jones) is listed among the 120 nationally significant 20th-century buildings in South Australia.

Half of the building, which is open to the public on weekdays, has heritage value. The other half was gutted by two fires in the 20th century and is now office space for The Royal Institution of Australia and the Australian Science Media Centre.

History
The establishment of The Royal Institution of Australia was amongst the recommendations Professor Greenfield made during her Adelaide residency, which included initiatives to encourage collaboration and complementary research programs across South Australian universities, science communication programs for children, professional development for school teachers and the establishment of the Australian Science Media Centre. A key recommendation was the Bragg Initiative, which encouraged a relationship between South Australia and the RiGB and was taken up by the South Australian government.

In June 2008, work commenced to convert the former Adelaide Stock Exchange building, which had remained empty for many years, into The Science Exchange.

The Royal Institution of Australia was opened on 8 October 2009 by the President of the Council of RiGB, HRH Prince Edward, Duke of Kent.

Bragg Initiative
The Bragg Initiative, which led to the initial development of The Royal Institution of Australia, was named for William Henry Bragg and William Lawrence Bragg. This father and son team won the 1915 Nobel Prize in Physics for their 'services in the analysis of crystal structures by means of X rays'. The Braggs hold a unique place in Australian and international history, as the only father-and-son team to be awarded a Nobel Prize. William (Henry) Bragg was the first Professor of Physics at the University of Adelaide and his son (William) Lawrence was born and educated in South Australia. Both returned to the UK and were subsequently Directors of The Royal Institution of Great Britain. Both father and son had an enormous passion for communicating science to the broader community. The Bragg Initiative was a program within the Department of the Premier and Cabinet, South Australian Government and was managed by Linda Cooper, Project Director.

Prof Adrienne Clarke AC, Dr Alan Finkel AO, Dr Andrew Thomas AO, Prof Barry Marshall AC, Dr Basil Hetzel AC (deceased), Prof Brian Cox OBE, Prof Brian Schmidt AC, Prof Carola Vinuesa, Prof Caroline McMillen, Emeritus Prof Christopher Burrell AO, Prof David Boger, Prof Elizabeth Blackburn AC, Prof Fiona Stanley AC, Prof Fiona Wood AM, Prof Graeme Clark AO, Prof Ian Chubb AC, Prof Ian Frazer AC, Emeritus Prof Ian Lowe AO, Dr J Robin Warren AC, Dr John O’Sullivan, Prof John Shine AO, Prof Lyn Beazley AO, Prof Marcello Costa, Prof Martin Green AM, Emeritus Prof Max Brennan AO, Prof Michael Archer AM, Prof Michelle Simmons, Emerita Prof Patricia Vickers-Rich, Prof Peter Doherty AC, Mr Peter Gago AC, Mr Robyn Williams AM, Prof Sir Gustav Nossal AC CBE, Prof Suzanne Cory AC, Prof Tanya Monro, Prof Terry Hughes, Prof Zee Upton, Prof Robin Batterham AO, Prof Stephen Hopper AC, Mr Tim Jarvis AM, Prof John Long, Prof Jennifer Martin, Scientia Prof Veena Sahajwalla, Assoc Prof Paul Willis.

Director
The Inaugural Director of the Royal Institution of Australia was Professor Gavin Brown AO, Scottish born mathematician and former Vice Chancellor of the University of Adelaide and the University of Sydney.

After the resignation of Professor Brown, the Hon. Dr Jane Lomax-Smith AM filled in as Acting Director (2010-2011). Associate Professor Paul Willis, science communicator, paleontologist, science journalist and broadcaster was the Director from 2011 and concluded his term in July 2017. In 2017 The Royal Institution of Australia appointed Mr Bradley Abraham as the Chief Executive and Director. In addition, the Council appointed Associate Professor Alan Duffy as its new Lead Scientist. Duffy is an astronomer and physicist working at Swinburne University of Technology. An author, Duffy is a leading expert on dark matter, dark energy, galaxy formation and cosmology.

Financial support 
RiAus receives financial and in-kind support from members, corporate partners and donors.

Governance 
The Royal Institution of Australia is governed by a council. As of 2020, council members are:
 Peter Yates AM, Chairman
 Professor Lyn Beazley
 Dr Gregory Clark AC
 Sir Rod Eddington AO
 Professor Caroline McMillen
 David Knox
 Christian Bennett
 Will Berryman
 Tony Clark
 Karen Dobson

See also
Royal Institution of Great Britain
William Henry Bragg
William Lawrence Bragg
Baroness Susan Greenfield
Thinkers in Residence
Australian Science Media Centre

References 

Culture of Adelaide
Scientific societies based in Australia
Organisations based in Adelaide
Organisations based in Australia with royal patronage
2009 establishments in Australia
Scientific organizations established in 2009